The Wakaya are an Aboriginal Australian people of the Northern Territory.

Country

Language

The Wakaya language is now extinct.

Social economy
The Wakaya were one of the Australian peoples, the others being the Watjarri, Wanman, Pitjantjatjara, Ngadadjara and Alyawarre, who are known to have harvested purslane seeds, and threshed them within stone circles for the oily nutrients they provided.

Land

In 1980 the Wakaya people lodged a land claim along with the Alyawarre people  for land somewhere near the remote outstation of Purrukwarra. As a result, they were handed back  on 22 October 1992, while the Alyawarre were given , both of which were only small parts of the original claim.

Alternative names
 Wagaja, Waggaia.
 Wagai, Waagai.
 Wagaiau, Waagi.
 Warkya.
 Wogaia, Worgaia, Worgai, Workaia, Warkaia.
 Workia, Workii, Woorkia.
 Lee-wakya.
 Akaja. ( Kaytetye exonym)
 Ukkia, Arkiya.

Notes

Citations

Sources

Aboriginal peoples of the Northern Territory